Lanka Sama Samaja Party (Alternative Group) is a Trotskyist political party in Sri Lanka, led by Chandra Kumarage. The party was formed following a split in the Lanka Sama Samaja Party. The party followed the same ideologies as any other Samasamaj Party. The party was affiliated with the  Fourth International

LSSP(AG) is a constituent of the New Left Front.

References 

Communist parties in Sri Lanka
Trotskyist organisations in Sri Lanka
Defunct political parties in Sri Lanka
Political parties in Sri Lanka